Goshayesh may refer to:
 Goshayesh, Hashtrud
 Goshayesh, Maragheh
 Goshayesh, Varzaqan